Kadachira is a census town and a suburb of kannur city in Kannur district in the Indian state of Kerala.

Demographics
As of 2011 Census, Kadachira had a population of 18,979 with 8,698 (45.8%) males and 10,281 (54.2%) females. The average sex ratio was 1182 higher than the state average of 1084. Kadachira has an average literacy rate of 97.7%, higher than the state average of 94%: male literacy was 98.8%, and female literacy was 96.8%. In Kadachira, 10.2% of the population was under 6 years of age.

References

Cities and towns in Kannur district
Thalassery road, Kannur